McWhinnie is a surname. Notable people with the surname include:

Archie McWhinnie (1926–1971), Scottish footballer
Debbie McWhinnie (born 1981), Scottish footballer
Mary Alice McWhinnie (1922–1980), American biologist

See also
McWhinnie Peak, a mountain of Victoria Land, Antarctica